Roberto Ezequiel Goméz Castillo (born August 3, 1989) is a Dominican former professional baseball pitcher. He has played for the San Francisco Giants of Major League Baseball (MLB).

Career

Tampa Bay Rays
Goméz made his professional debut with the Tampa Bay Rays organization in 2010 for the DSL Rays. In 2011, he played for the DSL Rays, GCL Rays, and Hudson Valley Renegades. In 2012, he played for the 
Bowling Green Hot Rods and in 2013 he played for the Charlotte Stone Crabs. In 2014, Goméz played for Charlotte and the Montgomery Biscuits. On October 8, 2014, the Rays released Goméz.

San Francisco Giants
On November 23, 2016, he signed a minor league deal with the San Francisco Giants and pitched for the Sacramento River Cats of the Class AAA Pacific Coast League. The Giants promoted him to the major leagues on September 5, 2017. He made his major league debut that day. He was released on July 5, 2018. He resigned on July 9, but became a free agent after the season ended.

On November 26, 2018, Gomez signed a minor league deal with the Pittsburgh Pirates. On February 19, 2019, Gomez’s contract was voided due to medical concerns in his physical exam.

References

External links

1989 births
Living people
Águilas Cibaeñas players
Arizona League Giants players
Bowling Green Hot Rods players
Charlotte Stone Crabs players
Dominican Republic expatriate baseball players in the United States
Dominican Summer League Rays players
Gulf Coast Rays players
Hudson Valley Renegades players

Major League Baseball pitchers
Major League Baseball players from the Dominican Republic
Montgomery Biscuits players
People from Santiago de los Caballeros
Sacramento River Cats players
San Francisco Giants players